Pokhozhaev's identity is an integral relation satisfied by stationary localized solutions to a nonlinear Schrödinger equation or nonlinear Klein–Gordon equation. It was obtained by S.I. Pokhozhaev and is similar to the virial theorem. This relation is also known as D.H. Derrick's theorem. Similar identities can be derived for other equations of mathematical physics.

The Pokhozhaev identity for the stationary nonlinear Schrödinger equation

Here is a general form due to H. Berestycki and P.-L. Lions.

Denote .
Let

be a solution to the equation
,
in the sense of distributions. 
Then  satisfies the relation

The Pokhozhaev identity for the stationary nonlinear Dirac equation

There is a form of the virial identity for the stationary nonlinear Dirac equation in three spatial dimensions (and also the Maxwell-Dirac equations) and in arbitrary spatial dimension.
Let 
and let  and  be the self-adjoint Dirac matrices of size :

Let  be the massless Dirac operator.
Denote .
Let  be a spinor-valued solution that satisfies the stationary form of the nonlinear Dirac equation,

in the sense of distributions,
Assume that

Then  satisfies the relation

See also
Virial theorem
Derrick's theorem

References

Mathematical_identities
Theorems in mathematical physics
Physics theorems